The women's discus throw event at the 2003 Asian Athletics Championships was held in Manila, Philippines on September 21.

Results

References

2003 Asian Athletics Championships
Discus throw at the Asian Athletics Championships
2003 in women's athletics